Grit is the last studio album by the Scottish Celtic fusion artist Martyn Bennett. It was released on 13 October 2003 on the Real World label.

Background
The album was recorded while Bennett was ill and unable to play his instruments, so instead he brought together samples of unaccompanied traditional Scottish folk singers, his own bagpipe and fiddle playing, and electronic drum beats. The opening track, Move, samples a recording of traditional singer Sheila Stewart performing Ewan MacColl’s Moving On Song. Stewart was delighted that he was taking her music to a new audience. The album features many other traditional Scottish singers, including Lizzie Higgins and Scottish Gaelic singer Flora MacNeil, as well as Michael Marra narrating an English translation of psalm 118 in the track Liberation.

In Bennett's sleeve notes for Grit, he wrote, “In recent years so many representations of Scotland have been misty-lensed and fanciful to the point that the word ‘Celtic’ has really become a cloudy pigeon hole. This album was a chance for me to present a truthful picture, yet face my own reflection in the great mirror of all cultures.”  The album skillfully interweaves old and new sounds and has been "credited with starting the musical evolution of Celtic fusion".

The album cover shows a photo of the artist standing on top of a hill, right behind a Trig - an Anagram of the album title.

Release 
Grit was re-released in May 2014 as part of the Real World Gold Series. In July 2017 Real World released the album on vinyl.

Track listing

Personnel
 Martyn Bennett – production, programming, sampling, string arrangements, viola (8), guitar, strings, harmonium, smallpipes, recording, mixing

Additional musicians
 Sheila Stewart – vocals (1)
 Lizzie Higgins – traditional arrangement (2), vocals (2)
 Millennia Strings – strings (2, 5)
 Andrew Skeet – conducting (2, 5)
 Mairi Morrison – traditional arrangement (3), vocals (3)
 Anni Watkins – traditional arrangement (4), vocals (4)
 Petrea Cooney – chorus vocals (4)
 Murdina MacDonald – vocals (5)
 Effie MacDonald – vocals (5)
 Michael Marra – recitation (5)
 Sorren Maclean – drums (5), guitar loop (5)
 John Barlow – drums (5), guitar loop (5)
 Gordon Maclean – double bass (5)
 Flora MacNeil – traditional arrangement (6), vocals (6)
 Jeannie Robertson – vocals (7)
 Kirsten Bennett – piano (5, 8, 10), cello (5, 8, 10)
 Jimmie McBeath – vocals (9)
 John Purser – overtone singing (10)

Technical personnel
 Marco Migliari – additional recording
 BJ Stewart – photography

2015 orchestral arrangement
The opening event of the 2015 Celtic Connections festival was a new orchestral arrangement of the complete album, arranged and conducted by Greg Lawson under the title "Nae Regrets" to mark the tenth anniversary of Bennett's death. Musicians performing included the Scottish Chamber Orchestra, jazz musicians Phil and Tom Bancroft, singers Fiona Hunter, Annie Grace, Karen Matheson and Rab Noakes, and pipers Ross Ainslie, Calum MacCrimmon, Fraser Fifield and Ali Hutton. Lawson observed that "It's amazing how many people you need to accomplish what he did by himself." 
The event was described in The Guardian as a "ballsy one-off".

Use in other media
The song "Blackbird" was used in the soundtrack for Danny MacAskill's 2014 film, The Ridge.

References

Externals links
 
 

Martyn Bennett albums
2003 albums
Real World Records albums